Suoyarvi is a town in the Republic of Karelia, Russia

Suoyarvi may also refer to:
Lake Suoyarvi, a lake in Russia from which the Shuya River flows
Suoyarvi I, a railway station in the town of Suoyarvi, Republic of Karelia, Russia
Suoyarvi II, a railway station in the town of Suoyarvi, Republic of Karelia, Russia